William Pitt (died 1840, in Malta) was an English ship-builder who was the Master Attendant at Jamaica Dockyard, and later of Malta. His amusing poem of "The Sailor's Consolation" is in many collections credited to Charles Dibdin.

References
Charles Dibdin, Sea songs and ballads, by Dibdin and others (1863), p. 192.
Nathan David Thompson, The Royal Gallery of Poetry and Art (1886) p. 538.

External links

English shipbuilders
1840 deaths
Year of birth unknown
English male poets